The Ford A series is a range of trucks that was built by Ford UK to bridge the gap between the relatively small Transit of 3.5 metric tonnes GVW and the bigger 7-tonne D series.

In 1967, Ford made the decision to carry out a thorough investigation of the sector of 3.5 to 7 ton GVW trucks.
The decision to introduce the range was made in 1970 and development began in early 1971.
Public debut for the A series was at the Frankfurt Motor Show 1973.
Some 20 vehicles running over 500,000 miles were used during the three-year, 12 million-pound proving and development programme.

The A series was commercially first introduced on September 13, 1973.
Over 350 basic variants were built, allowing for wheelbase, gross weight, engine and body types, and also LHD and RHD.
Even an articulated tractor or "baby" artic, the AA0709 with a GCW of 6600 kg was added to the range but only sold in the UK.
The "A" cab shared most components with the Transit and the most notable differences are the longer and wider wings, longer hood and a different grille.
Unlike the Transit that had a facelift in 1977/1978 the "A" retained its profile for the entire period of production.

The A series could be divided into two categories:
 The smaller A04xx with 14-inch wheels, 6x170 mm bolt pattern, and four-cylinder engines.
 The bigger A05xx / A06xx with 16-inch wheels, 6×205 mm bolt pattern, stronger frame and six-cylinder engines.
 A 4x4 version was also offered by Reynolds Boughton and was intended for various special applications.

Four different engines were offered: a 2.4l 4-cylinder diesel. A 3.54l 6-cylinder diesel, actually a 2.4 with 2 more cylinders, a 2l V4 petrol and a 3l V6 petrol.
Three transmissions were offered: Ford 4-speed 4-310 synchro only on 2-3-4, Turner 4 spd T4-150 1-2-3-4 synchro, and the ZF 5 spd S5-24/3 1-2-3-4-5 synchro offered as a high capacity unit.
3 driving axles were offered: The versions with 14-inch wheels had a slightly modified 50-series axle (Ford type 24) similar to the Transit. Ratios 4.625 and 5.125
Single 16 in wheel models had a Salisbury Engineering 8HA/Dana 60 (Ford type 27). Ratios 4.88 to 6.17.
Dual 16 in wheel models had a Salisbury Engineering 10HA/Dana 70HD (Ford type 42). Ratios 4.88 to 7.17.
Four wheelbases were offered: 120, 130, 145 and 156 inches (3.05, 3.3, 3.68 and 3.96 m).

Production ended in 1983. Effectively, the gap left by the A series range was filled up by the rebadged versions of the Iveco Daily sold by Ford and also the heavier versions of the new (for then) Ford Transit which debuted in 1986.

References

External links 
 Anatomy of the A-series light truck range, Ford Motor Company Ltd Brentwood Essex
 Ford Panel Vans by Len Cole pp 61,62

A series
A series
Vehicles introduced in 1973